Udo Segreff (born July 20, 1973) is a German ice sledge hockey player.

He placed 4th with the German ice sledge hockey team at the 2006 Paralympic Games in Turin, Italy.

He has one gold and one bronze from the European Ice Sledge Hockey Championships.

He has 11 national titles and was 8 times best scorer. Also he is the best scorer on the German national team.

References

External links 
 

1973 births
Living people
German ice hockey forwards
German sledge hockey players
Ice sledge hockey players at the 2006 Winter Paralympics
Paralympic sledge hockey players of Germany